The League One Play-Off Final is a series of play-off games that determine the one or both of teams who are promoted to the Championship. The play-offs have included different number of teams since 2009.

History

2003: Institution
A Third Division was reintroduced in 2003 and was branded as National League Two. It was decided a play-off system would be introduced in both National Leagues One and Two to decide who would be promoted from their respective leagues. A six team play-off was implemented in both divisions.

2004–2005: Promotion/relegation play-off
In 2004 promotion and relegation between both National Leagues was restructured. Now the team finishing top of the National League Two would be automatically promoted while teams finishing between 2nd and 6th competed in a five team play-off where the team reaching the final would play the team that finished second from bottom in National League One.

2006–2013: One up and five team play-off
After just two years the promotion/ relegation play-off was scrapped in favour of a more traditional play-off. Under the new system the team finishing first would still be promoted and a six team play-off would be competed by teams finishing 2nd to 7th.

This system was not used in 2012 due to a league restructure, where the top 4 teams were promoted but competed in the Champions Play-off. The teams finishing 5th and 6th also competed in the play-off but were not guaranteed promotion.

2014: Grand Final
Due to another league restructure taking place for the 2015 season, the make up of the play-offs was changed again for one season. A top 5 play-off would be used team winning the Grand Final being promoted.

2015–2016: Promotion and play-off finals
Two new play-off systems were implemented in 2015, the Promotion Final and League 1 Play-offs. The top two teams would play in the Promotion Final with the winner being promoted. The loser would then join 3rd, 4th and 5th in the play-offs with the winner being promoted.

2017–2018: Four team play-off
Halfway through the 2017 season, it was announced that the Promotion Final would be scrapped in favour of the top team being automatically promoted while 2nd to 5th would play-off for the final promotion spot. The same system was used in 2018 bit the loser of the Play-off Final would have a second chance at promotion by playing 12th in the Championship due to a league restructure.

2019–Present: Return to one up and five team play-off
At an EGM in 2018 the League 1 clubs voted in another restructure of the play-offs and promotion spots. From 2019 onwards they would use the same system used between 2006 and 2013 by having first being promoted automatically and 2nd to 6th competing in a five team play-off.

Results

Winners

See also

Championship Grand Final
Million Pound Game

References

External links

RFL League 1
Rugby league club matches